Mullaghanattin is a summit of the Dunkerron Mountains, part of the Mountains of the Iveragh Peninsula in County Kerry, Ireland.

Geography 
The mountain lies southwest of Stumpa Dúloigh, the highest mountain of the Dunkerron range. With an elevation is 773 metres it is the 58th highest summit in Ireland.

Access to the summit 
Mullaghanattin summit can be accessed from Tooreennahone parking, then walking through gentle slopes which become very steep only for the last km.

References

External links
 Mullaghanattin at MountainViews

Mountains and hills of County Kerry
Mountains under 1000 metres
Marilyns of Ireland
Hewitts of Ireland